Ramu is a 1966 Indian Tamil-language drama film directed by A. C. Tirulokchandar and written by Javar N. Seetharaman. The film stars Gemini Ganesh and K. R. Vijaya, with Ashokan, Nagesh, V. K. Ramasamy, O. A. K. Thevar and Master Rajkumar—as the title character—in supporting roles. A remake of the Hindi film Door Gagan Ki Chhaon Mein (1964), it revolves around a boy who loses his voice after witnessing his mother's death, and his father attempts to restore his son's voice.

Ramu was produced by Uma Productions, a subsidiary of AVM Productions, and predominantly shot in the village of Kaduvetti. It was released on 10 June 1966 and became a commercial success, winning the National Film Award for Best Feature Film in Tamil. The film was remade in Telugu with the same title in 1968 by the same studio and director, with Rajkumar reprising his role.

Plot 
Raja, a soldier in the Indian Army, returns to his village to be with his wife Seetha and son Ramu during Pongal. He receives a telegram ordering him to report for duty and has to leave. During the war, Raja's superior is wounded and dies in Raja's arms after mentioning his unmarried daughter. In Raja's absence, dacoits invade Raja's village and torch several houses, including Raja's. Ramu, who witnesses Seetha's death in the fire, loses his voice due to trauma. He awaits his father's return for days. Raja returns, unaware of the events in the village. After reuniting with Ramu, he learns of his wife's death and son's loss of voice. Raja and Ramu leave the village to seek treatment for Ramu; they pass through a village where a woman named Seethalakshmi, or Lakshmi, whose father has recently died, lives alone. Ganganna, her maternal uncle, has two sons; Rangan, who is as unscrupulous as his father, and Muthu, who is sympathetic. 

Ganganna, avaricious for Lakshmi's wealth, orders her to marry Rangan; she refuses and Ganganna harasses her, unsuccessfully sending mediators to persuade her. When Raja is fetching water, Ramu inadvertently drops firewood. Rangan, who is passing by, slaps Ramu for dropping the wood. Raja beats Rangan and Rangan strikes Raja on the head, who faints. Lakshmi takes Raja and Ramu into her home and nurses Raja, who recovers. Ganganna prevents workers from tilling Lakshmi's land so Raja helps her by hiring a tractor and completing the work with minimal workforce. Raja helps Lakshmi manage her farm and she gradually becomes attracted to him. Lakshmi becomes close to Ramu, who reciprocates. Raja, however, refuses to return Lakshmi's feelings because he is still grieving for his wife. Raja saves Lakshmi from an attempted molestation by Rangan and discovers she is his deceased superior's daughter. 

Ramu visits a nearby forest and becomes acquainted with a mentally unstable man who was once a Tamil teacher. Rangan and Ganganna ask Sangili, a dacoit, to kill Raja. Ramu recognises Sangili and tells his father Sangili is responsible for Seetha's death. Raja locates Sangili, beats him and forces him to leave the village. Sangili returns to kill Raja but is thwarted by Ramu and again subdued by Raja. Sangili is arrested. The physician treating Ramu recommends he be taken to an ENT specialist in Madras for treatment and Raja agrees. The ENT specialist advises psychological treatment but the psychologist is unable to offer a solution. Raja becomes dejected; after being robbed, he attempts suicide with his son but both listen to a prayer, reconsider and return to Lakshmi's village. Lakshmi insists they continue living with her; Raja agrees and Ramu wants to be with Lakshmi. 

One night, Rangan secretly harvests crops from Lakshmi's land and his own, and frames Raja for doing so. Raja is arrested and Ramu's dog is tied in one of Rangan's houses because it witnessed Rangan harvesting. Ramu hears his dog barking and enters the house to free it but he is also tied up. The Tamil teacher, searching for Ramu, enters the house and sees Ganganna, who earlier cheated on the Tamil teacher's daughter, leading her to drown herself in a well. The Tamil teacher intimidates Ganganna into falling into the same well. Lakshmi arrives at the house in search of Ramu but Rangan tries to molest her. The dog escapes and brings Raja, who was released, to the house. Raja fights Rangan and a fire breaks out, causing Lakshmi to faint. Before the fire can engulf her, Ramu suddenly regains his voice and shouts at Lakshmi; Lakshmi awakens and they safely leave the house. Police arrest Rangan and the Tamil teacher surrenders, claiming responsibility for killing Ganganna. Later, Raja plans to leave the village with Ramu but Ramu refuses to leave Lakshmi. Raja agrees to marry Lakshmi and remains in the village.

Cast

Production

Development 
While in Bombay (now Mumbai) for the production of the film Do Kaliyaan (1968), M. Saravanan of AVM Productions chanced upon a film banner featuring Kishore Kumar and a boy. Saravanan learned the Hindi film was Door Gagan Ki Chhaon Mein (1964), and Chinna Menon, the manager of the Bombay branch of AVM, told him it was unsuccessful but he was convinced the story was different. After enquiring further about the story, he learned it was about a mute boy. Saravanan asked Menon for a print of Door Gagan Ki Chhaon Mein to watch but Menon did not take the request seriously. Subramaniam of Venus Pictures had bought the rights to remake the film in Tamil for  but later sold the rights to Saravanan for the same amount plus .

Saravanan screened Door Gagan Ki Chhaon Mein for his father A. V. Meiyappan; brothers Murugan and Kumaran; directors Krishnan–Panju; screenwriter Javar N. Seetharaman and director A. C. Tirulokchandar. Krishnan–Panju detested the film and Seetharaman believed a film featuring a child in a prominent role could only succeed if the child had powerful dialogue, evidenced by the success of AVM's Kalathur Kannamma (1960); he was sceptical because the boy in Door Gagan Ki Chhaon Mein was mute. Saravanan suggested writing the cause of the boy's muteness, an idea Seetharaman accepted and began writing the screenplay. Tirulokchandar was finalised as director, and was paid . After the title Ramu was finalised, friends of Saravanan had misgivings but he refused to change the title. The film was produced by Murugan, Kumaran and Saravanan under Uma Productions, a subsidiary of AVM. Cinematography was handled by T. Muthusamy and D. Rajagopal, editing by R. G. Gope, and art direction by A. K. Sekhar.

Casting and filming 

After Kalathur Kannamma, AVM had not approached Gemini Ganesh for any film. When Ganesh met AVM and asked why, AVM said they could not afford to meet Ganesh's financial demands, which was substantially higher than the – they were paying other actors. Ganesh said he would be willing to act for any amount. Though Murugan, Kumaran and Saravanan planned to cast Jaishankar, whom they felt was the right person to subdue the dacoits onscreen, Meiyappan felt Ganesh could better convey the character's grief for his wife's death and his son's loss of voice; they agreed with their father's choice of Ganesh.

K. R. Vijaya was cast after the producers were impressed with her performance in Karpagam (1963). Yogendrakumar, later known as Master Rajkumar, was chosen to play the title character from over 100 children who screen-tested. This was his first Tamil film; he had previously appeared in several Kannada, Telugu and Malayalam films. Meiyappan felt the name Yogendrakumar was not appealing to Tamil audiences and gave him his new name. Ramu was mostly filmed in the village of Kaduvetti. The climax scene, depicting Ramu and Seethalakshmi in a burning room, was filmed over five days; kerosene was used to light the fire. When the fire was weakening, more kerosene was added, leading to increased fire. Vijaya was quickly helped out but Rajkumar was tied up so Tirulokchandar ran in and saved him.

Soundtrack 
The music composed by M. S. Viswanathan. The lyrics of all songs were penned by Kannadasan. The song "Nilave Ennidam" is set in the Hindustani raga Bageshri, and "Kannan Vandhan" is set to Yaman. During the recording of this song, the original singer was unable to match the "weighty" singing of co-performer Sirkazhi Govindarajan, so he was replaced with T. M. Soundararajan.

Release and reception 
Ramu was released on 10 June 1966. The film was a commercial success, running for over 100 days in theatres, and won the National Film Award for Best Feature Film in Tamil. Kalki appreciated Tirulokchandar's direction, Seetharaman's writing, and called Ramu a pleasing family film. Kumar, after watching the film, said it made him realise how weakly he had written the original film; he appreciated Seetharaman for making a superior product. His brother Ashok appreciated Seetharaman for making "suitable changes" that made the Tamil film more successful.

Legacy 
Ramu was remade in Telugu under the same title in 1968 by the same studio and director, with Rajkumar reprising his role. K. Bhagyaraj said the inspiration for the story of Mundhanai Mudichu (1983) was a poster of Ramu that Bhagyaraj had seen as a child. The poster featured the protagonist with his motherless son. Bhagyaraj wondered how it would be if he were in that position and prepared the story of Mundhanai Mudichu. Unlike Ramu, the protagonist's son was changed from a preteen to an infant.

References

Bibliography

External links 
 
 

1960s Tamil-language films
1966 drama films
1966 films
AVM Productions films
Best Tamil Feature Film National Film Award winners
Films directed by A. C. Tirulokchandar
Films scored by M. S. Viswanathan
Films with screenplays by Javar Seetharaman
Indian drama films
Tamil films remade in other languages
Tamil remakes of Hindi films